Sasha Kate Moloney (born 14 June 1992) is an Australian cricketer who plays as a right-handed  batter and right-arm off break bowler for Tasmanian Tigers and Melbourne Stars. From May to August 2015, she played for Typhoons in Ireland's inaugural Women's Super 3s, a competition involving both 50 over and T20 matches.  She has also played cricket in the Netherlands.

Moloney was a part of the Hurricanes squad for its inaugural WBBL01 season (2015–16).  She remained in the squad for the WBBL02 season (2016–17).

Moloney's career has been marred by knee injuries.  She missed the entire 2013–14 season due to a knee reconstruction, and suffered another knee injury during a WBBL match in December 2016.

In November 2018, she was named in the Hobart Hurricanes' squad where she was also named captain for the 2018–19 Women's Big Bash League season.

References

External links

Sasha Moloney at Cricket Australia

1992 births
Australian women cricketers
Cricketers from Tasmania
Hobart Hurricanes (WBBL) cricketers
Melbourne Stars (WBBL) cricketers
Living people
People from Longford, Tasmania
Tasmanian Tigers (women's cricket) cricketers